Peera Piromrut (born 1 April 1958) is a Thai sports shooter. He competed in the men's 25 metre rapid fire pistol event at the 1984 Summer Olympics.

References

1958 births
Living people
Peera Piromrut
Peera Piromrut
Shooters at the 1984 Summer Olympics
Place of birth missing (living people)
Shooters at the 1986 Asian Games
Shooters at the 1990 Asian Games
Shooters at the 1994 Asian Games
Shooters at the 1998 Asian Games
Asian Games medalists in shooting
Peera Piromrut
Peera Piromrut
Peera Piromrut
Medalists at the 1986 Asian Games
Medalists at the 1990 Asian Games
Peera Piromrut